New Johnsonville is a city in Humphreys County, Tennessee, United States. The population was 1,951 at the 2010 census.

History

Johnsonville, named for Andrew Johnson, was most notably the site of the Battle of Johnsonville during the Civil War. Johnsonville was inundated by the Tennessee Valley Authority's construction of Kentucky Dam in 1944, and many of its residents moved to the current site of New Johnsonville, which was incorporated in 1949.

Geography
New Johnsonville is located along the western border of Humphreys County at  (36.019087, -87.967619). It is on the east side of Kentucky Lake on the Tennessee River. U.S. Route 70 passes through the city, leading northeast  to Waverly, the Humphreys county seat, and west  to Camden.

Demographics

2020 census

As of the 2020 United States census, there were 1,804 people, 729 households, and 533 families residing in the city.

2000 census
As of the census of 2000, there were 1,905 people, 747 households, and 578 families residing in the city. The population density was 340.6 people per square mile (131.6/km2). There were 861 housing units at an average density of 154.0 per square mile (59.5/km2). The racial makeup of the city was 97.43% White, 1.26% African American, 0.10% Native American, 0.31% Asian, 0.10% from other races, and 0.79% from two or more races. 0.52% of the population were Hispanic or Latino of any race.

There were 747 households, out of which 32.5% had children under the age of 18 living with them, 65.6% were married couples living together, 8.8% had a female householder with no husband present, and 22.6% were non-families. 19.4% of all households were made up of individuals, and 6.7% had someone living alone who was 65 years of age or older. The average household size was 2.55 and the average family size was 2.89.

In the city the population was spread out, with 24.8% under the age of 18, 6.9% from 18 to 24, 28.3% from 25 to 44, 27.7% from 45 to 64, and 12.2% who were 65 years of age or older. The median age was 40 years. For every 100 females, there were 94.2 males. For every 100 females age 18 and over, there were 95.9 males.

The median income for a household in the city was $46,500, and the median income for a family was $51,406. Males had a median income of $41,161 versus $22,813 for females. The per capita income for the city was $20,756. 8.8% of the population and 6.7% of families were below the poverty line. Out of the total population, 12.8% of those under the age of 18 and 5.2% of those 65 and older were living below the poverty line.

Economy
New Johnsonville is the location of the Johnsonville Combustion Turbine Plant, formerly known as the Johnsonville Fossil Plant which operated from 1951 to 2017. The plant generated electricity for the region and produces steam for the nearby Chemours plant which makes 25% of America's titanium oxide supply.

Recreation

References

External links

Cities in Humphreys County, Tennessee
Cities in Tennessee
Tennessee populated places on the Tennessee River